The Original(s) may refer to:

Books and publishing
 The Original, a literary periodical founded in 1829 by Frances Harriet Whipple Green McDougall
 The Original Magazine, arts and culture magazine in Pittsburgh
 The Originals (comics), a 2004 graphic novel by Dave Gibbons

Film and television
 The Originals (film), a 2017 Egyptian film
 The Originals (TV series), an American TV series
 "The Originals" (The Vampire Diaries), an episode
 "The Original" (Westworld), an episode

Music
 The Originals (band), Detroit soul group, backing singers to Marvin Gaye
 Rosie and the Originals
 The Original (group), a dance music group known for their 1994 single "I Luv U Baby"

Albums
 The Original (album), a 2003 album by Sarai
 The Original, a 1992 album by Burning Spear
 The Original, a 2012 album by Remady & Manu-L

 The Originals (Kiss album), 1976
 The Originals (The Statler Brothers album), 1979

Other uses
 The Original All Blacks, a New Zealand rugby team
 The Original Dinerant, Portland, Oregon, U.S.
 The Originals (website), a book series and now website about every possible song or musical composition and its covers

See also 
 Origin (disambiguation)
 Original (disambiguation)